Barathronus is a genus of deep-sea fish that are placed in the family Aphyonidae (blind cusk eels) or family Bythitidae (brotulas), depending on the source.

Life cycle
Barathronus are viviparous deep-sea fish. However, a juvenile Barathronus pacificus has been recorded in shallow waters. Based on the stable oxygen isotope composition of otoliths, at least one species, Barathronus maculatus, has a pelagic larval stage, followed by an ontogenetic vertical migration to deeper waters.

Species
There are currently 10 recognized species in this genus, although the exact species differ between the FishBase and the Catalog of Fishes: 

 Barathronus affinis A. B. Brauer, 1906
 Barathronus bicolor Goode & T. H. Bean, 1886 
 Barathronus bruuni J. G. Nielsen, 1969
 Barathronus diaphanus A. B. Brauer, 1906
 Barathronus linsi J. G. Nielsen, Mincarone & di Dario, 2015  — not listed in the FishBase
 Barathronus maculatus Shcherbachev, 1976 (Spotted gelatinous cusk)
 Barathronus multidens J. G. Nielsen, 1984
 Barathronus pacificus J. G. Nielsen & Eagle, 1974
 Barathronus parfaiti (Vaillant, 1888)
 Barathronus solomonensis J. G. Nielsen & Møller, 2008 — recognized as Paraphyonus solomonensis in the Catalog of Fishes
 Barathronus unicolor J. G. Nielsen, 1984

References

Aphyonidae
Marine fish genera
Taxa named by George Brown Goode
Taxa named by Tarleton Hoffman Bean